Pero, also known as Filiya,is a West Chadic language of Nigeria.

Chadic Languages

Chadic language is one of the language spoken in different part of African. Chadic languages is from a branch of Afroasiatic also called Afro-Chadic. These languages is well known in different part of African including ; Northern Nigeria(Hausa and Fulani), Northern Cameroon, Southern Niger, Southern Chad, Central African, and many other African States.

References

West Chadic languages
Languages of Nigeria